ANAC may refer to:

Civil aviation agencies
Agence nationale de l'aviation civile (disambiguation), several French-speaking agencies
Autorité Nationale de l'Aviation Civile, a government agency in Côte d'Ivoire
National Civil Aviation Administration, an Argentine government agency
National Civil Aviation Agency of Brazil, a Brazilian government agency
National Institute of Civil Aviation of Portugal, a Portuguese government agency

Other uses
Association of Nurses in AIDS Care, a professional association
Auckland Nuclear Accessory Company, a former New Zealand company
Automatic number announcement circuit, a service for technicians to identify a telephone line
National Anti-Corruption Authority (Italy) (A.N.AC.), an Italian administrative authority